Annefleur Bruggeman (born 27 July 1997) is a Dutch handball player for Bayer Leverkusen.

Bruggeman made 16 appearances for the Dutch youth national team. She participated at the 2016 U20 World Cup.

In 2022 she moved to Bundesliga club Neckarsulmer SU with a contract running until 2024.

References

External links

1997 births
Living people
Dutch female handball players
People from Echt-Susteren
Expatriate handball players
Dutch expatriate sportspeople in Germany
Sportspeople from Limburg (Netherlands)
21st-century Dutch women